Face Value is the debut solo studio album by English drummer and singer-songwriter Phil Collins, released on 13 February 1981 by Virgin Records. After his first wife filed for divorce in 1979, Collins began to write songs during a break in activity from Genesis with much of the material concerning his personal life. The album was recorded from mid-1980 to early 1981 with Collins and Hugh Padgham as producers. Additional musicians include the Phenix Horns, Alphonso Johnson, and Eric Clapton.

Face Value was an instant commercial success and reached No. 1 on the UK Albums Chart for three weeks and No. 7 on the US Billboard 200. It has since sold over 5 million copies in the US and over 1.5 million in the UK. The album received widespread praise from critics. Its lead single "In the Air Tonight", released in January 1981, reached No. 2 on the UK Singles Chart and became known for its drum arrangement and use of gated reverb. In January 2016, Face Value was reissued with bonus tracks and new photography in the style of the original but featuring a present-day Collins.

Background and writing
By 1978, Phil Collins had been a member of English progressive rock band Genesis for almost eight years. After spending the first five as their drummer, he reluctantly accepted the role of frontman of the group in 1975 following the departure of the band's original singer, Peter Gabriel. Three years later, after departure of guitarist Steve Hackett, Genesis' nine-month world tour to promote ...And Then There Were Three... (1978) became problematic for Collins's wife Andrea who complained that he was not at home enough and that should he commit to the full tour, she would not be there when he returned. Collins, however, maintained that the band were on the cusp of international breakthrough and the tour would pay dividends for the future. However, at the end of the tour, Andrea decided to take their two children to her parents in Vancouver, Canada. In an attempt to save his marriage, Collins moved to Vancouver, but the attempt failed. Collins returned to England in April 1979, with Andrea having agreed to return with the children.

With Genesis members Tony Banks and Mike Rutherford working on their solo albums through 1979, Collins used some of his spare time to write songs. He told Modern Drummer early that year:

In his home in Shalford, Surrey, named Old Croft, Collins set up a Sequential Prophet-5 synthesiser, piano, Roland CR-78 drum machine, and an 8-track tape machine in his bedroom, and recorded a collection of demos with backing tracks and early lyrics. He was not concerned with the quality of the recordings as what may have lacked in the recordings would have been salvaged with the emotion in the songs. There were numerous times where Collins stopped recording earlier than planned as the ideas were not working in the studio, leaving him to resume the following day. Collins based the majority of Face Value on the divorce he had endured, and used a solo album as an outlet for his feelings.

During the conception of the album, Collins had forged a close friendship with John Martyn and contributed towards Grace and Danger (1980), which contained a similar narrative relating to divorce and relationship breakdown. Some of Collins' material that he had written was performed by Genesis on Duke (1980), including "Misunderstanding", the arrangement of which remained unchanged. He had played "In the Air Tonight" and "If Leaving Me is Easy" to the group, but they were left out as Collins said they were "too simple for the band".

Early album titles included Interiors and Exposure. To release the album, Collins signed a solo contract with Virgin Records for UK distribution. He did so to "leave the nest" and to ensure he could maintain full creative control over the music. Collins also felt that releasing the album on Charisma Records, the same label as Genesis, would have harmed its success due to the preconceived notions people have about bands and labels. Collins thought a new label would benefit the casual listener and appeal to a wider audience. Virgin gave Collins a £65,000 advance on the album.

Production

Recording
Recording sessions for Face Value took place at the Town House in London and the Village Recorder in Los Angeles between August and December 1980. The demos recorded onto 8-track were transferred onto 24-track. According to Classic Albums, in what was considered a controversial move at the time, Collins, who grew up listening to American R&B as a child in Chiswick, decided to incorporate an R&B horn section, hiring the Phenix Horns, who played backup for Earth, Wind & Fire. Collins had asked a contact who knew the group if they were interested in playing, and upon their agreement their leader Thomas "Tom Tom 84" Washington met with Collins who asked him to sing the sections where the horns were to be placed into a tape recorder. The group recorded their parts the following day.

Collins produced the album himself with assistance from Hugh Padgham, who would co-produce several of Collins and Genesis's subsequent albums in the 1980s.  Initially he considered George Clinton, Maurice White, or Phil Ramone until he realised that he merely wanted someone to endorse his own ideas. Assistant recording engineer Nick Launay was hired after Collins was impressed with his work with Public Image Limited. Collins was dissatisfied with initial test cuts of the album, describing them like a Queen album, "big, British and upfront". He then listened to several albums by black musicians including ones by The Jacksons and a collection of soul artists in his own collection, and noticed a common link with technician Mike Reese who worked at a Los Angeles mastering lab. Reese prepared a cut which Collins was satisfied with.

Songs
The simple style of music on Face Value was reasoned by Collins as his fondness of Weather Report's simple melodies and for black music. Collins controversially included drum programming rather than just live drum instrumentation despite his reputation as a drummer. Collins said he wanted to experiment with different sounds and was inspired by the work of his former bandmate Peter Gabriel, who had used drum programming on his last album; Collins was part of these sessions. Many of the songs' arrangements were done by Collins and session arranger Thomas "Tom Tom 84" Washington. He incorporated Indian-styled violins, played by L. Shankar, for additional textures.

The last recording session for Face Value was in January 1981, prior to the release of the first single, "In the Air Tonight". Atlantic CEO Ahmet Ertegun advised Collins to perform drums during the verses and opening of the song, whereas the album version does not feature live drumming until the bridge.

The album features songs of different genres. While technically a rock and pop offering, the basis of many of the tracks lies in R&B with light funk influences, especially in "I'm Not Moving", for which Collins sang his backgrounds with a vocoder. "Droned" and "Hand in Hand" are progressive rock instrumentals, with the first featuring an Indian raga sound, while "Hand in Hand" features jazz elements, a black children's choir from Los Angeles humming the music, and improvisational instrumentation by Collins and the Phenix Horns. "The Roof Is Leaking" has Delta blues and country elements. "Behind the Lines" was originally recorded by Genesis on Duke album as a progressive rock number. Collins worked up a horn-driven R&B/funk-inspired arrangement after speeding up the tape on the Genesis version and thinking that the sped-up version sounded like a Michael Jackson song. The cover of The Beatles' "Tomorrow Never Knows" includes instruments and vocals playing in reverse while Collins provided multi-layered background vocals and sparse drumming. After the song ends, Collins can be heard quietly singing "Over the Rainbow" in reference to the recent murder of John Lennon; this final song is unlisted on most releases of the album (the original US cassette version being an exception), and marks the only time Collins used a hidden track on one of his own releases.

Four songs Collins wrote during the Face Value sessions were ultimately omitted: "Misunderstanding" and "Please Don't Ask" which appeared in the Genesis album Duke, "How Can You Just Sit There" (which evolved into his 1984 single "Against All Odds (Take a Look at Me Now)"), and what would become  "Don't Lose My Number", which would not appear until Collins' third album No Jacket Required in 1985. According to Collins "Don't Let Him Steal Your Heart Away" and "Why Can't It Wait 'Til Morning" (from Hello, I Must Be Going) were written during the Face Value sessions.

Packaging
Collins regarded Face Value as a highly personal project, which gave rise to the iconic cover art with Collins' face in extreme close-up, originally intended to symbolise the listener "getting into his head"; the reverse side of the sleeve shows the rear of his head, although the CD version of the album placed this image on the insert card instead. To emphasise the personal nature of the album, Collins also hand wrote all of the liner and sleeve notes, even down to the legal statements on the outer circumference of the centre label of the disc itself. Both of the main visual elements of Face Value — the facial close-up, and the handwritten notes — would become a motif of Collins' subsequent albums until 1996's Dance into the Light. When crediting the musicians in the liner notes, rather than write "Phil Collins", Collins simply wrote "Me", although in future albums he would write his initials "PC".

Commercial performance
Face Value became an immediate success, reaching No. 1 in the UK, Canada, and other European countries, while peaking in the top ten in the US. "In the Air Tonight" became the album's biggest hit, reaching No. 2 in the UK, No. 1 in three other countries, and becoming a top twenty hit in the US. Other songs such as "I Missed Again" found modest success reaching No. 14 in the UK and No. 19 in the US, while the third single, "If Leaving Me Is Easy", reached No. 17 in the UK but was not released in America. Sales of the album reached five million in the US and went five-times platinum in the UK and ten-times platinum in Canada. No solo tour was produced from this album.

Critical reception

Robin Smith of Record Mirror highlighted the album's emotional restraint, commenting that it plays less like a statement of "raw emotion" and more like a "diary" of Collins' "disappointments, hopes and fantasies". In Sounds, Hugh Fielder said that it effectively captured Collins' "multi-faceted" musicality with songs ranging "from funky beat to melancholic ballads with occasional pop and avant garde twinges." Melody Makers Allan Jones considered Face Value a compelling stylistic divergence from Collins' work in Genesis, writing that the album "delights in confounding the familiar parameters" of the band's music. Rolling Stone critic Steve Pond was more reserved in his praise. He complimented Collins for forgoing Genesis' "high-blown conceits" for a simpler sound rooted in "basic pop and R&B", but found that "[his] broken heart is too clearly on his sleeve, and musical missteps abound". Pond nonetheless deemed it "unmistakably the most worthy Genesis product" since Peter Gabriel's 1977 debut album.

In 2000, Face Value was voted number 329 in Colin Larkin's All Time Top 1000 Albums. In a retrospective review for AllMusic, Tim Sendra described Face Value as "Collins' most honest, most compelling work", which "stands as his masterpiece and one of the finest moments of the '80s musical landscape." Writing for Ultimate Classic Rock in 2013, Will Levith called it a "now-classic" album, highlighting in particular "In the Air Tonight", "which just about everybody has played air drums to one time or another", but added, "The project's most forgettable moment, however, is the closing track – an absolutely atrocious cover of 'Tomorrow Never Knows' [...] Why Collins thought it was necessary to lay such a giant turd on an otherwise awesome album is beyond us."

Reviewing the album's 2016 reissue, Uncuts Sharon O'Connell said that Face Value established Collins as a "premier-league" pop and soft rock performer, "nursing only a slight prog hangover", and Mojos Paul Elliott wrote that it remained Collins' best solo record, noting its deeply personal core themes. Dorset Echo writer Joanna Davis said, "Most of the tracks stand the test of time, but some, like 'If Leaving Me is Easy', belong in the forgotten land of 80s ballads preceded by a saxophone introduction." Dorian Lynskey of The Guardian characterised the album in 2016 as "an intriguing debut, wandering between art-rock and soulful MOR... Face Values most potent quality was its emotional transparency. Like the pensive portrait on the cover, the songs addressed the listener with unflinching directness."

Track listing
Original releaseNotesSeveral original vinyl copies have "Play Loud" etched into the album's inner groove where the matrix number is typically found. This may be because the record's baked-in volume is relatively low compared to others'.
The album was re-released and remastered by Steve Hoffman for the Audio Fidelity label in 2010.
A 2-disc remastered version of Face Value was released on 29 January 2016 and contains live songs and demos.

Deluxe Edition (2016)

Demos
There were many songs which were omitted from the album including:
"Please Don't Break My Heart" [demo released in mp3 through website in 2011]
"How Can You Sit There? (Against All Odds)" [released on 'Face Value' Reissue Bonus CD in 2016]
"Misunderstanding" [released on Face Value Reissue Bonus CD in 2016]
"Please Don't Ask" [released on Face Value Reissue Bonus CD in 2016]

Personnel

 Phil Collins – vocals, drums, Roland VP-330 vocoder (1, 6, 10), CR-78 drum machine (1, 6, 12), Prophet-5 synthesizer (1, 2, 5–7, 10–12), Fender Rhodes (1, 2, 9, 11), percussion (2, 10), piano (4–8, 10), handclaps (5, 9), congas (5), marimba (6), acoustic guitar (13)
 Daryl Stuermer – guitars (1, 2, 3, 6, 7, 9, 11, 12), banjo (4), 12-string guitar (5)
 Eric Clapton – guitar (4, 11)
 Joe Partridge – slide guitar (4)
 John Giblin – bass guitar (1, 9, 10, 12)
 Alphonso Johnson – bass (2, 3, 6, 7, 11)
 L. Shankar – violin (1, 5, 7, 12), tamboura (5), "voice drums" (5)
 J. Peter Robinson – Prophet-5 (3)
 Stephen Bishop – background vocals (2)
 Arif Mardin – string arrangements (8, 11)
 EWF Horns – horns
 Don Myrick – tenor saxophone (3, 6, 7, 9, 12), alto sax solo (11)
 Louis Satterfield – trombone (3, 6, 7, 9, 12)
 Rahmlee Michael Davis and Michael Harris – trumpets (3, 6, 7, 9, 12), flugelhorns (11)
 Ronnie Scott – tenor saxophone solo (7)
 Music preparation – Maurice Spears
 Other background vocals on tracks 6 and 12 by several children's choirs in Los Angeles
 Strings on tracks 8 and 11 conducted by Martyn Ford
 Violins – Gavyn Wright , Bill Benhem, Bruce Dukov, David Woodcock, Liz Edwards, Irvine Arditti, Ken Sillitoe, Peter Oxen and Richard Studt
 Viola – Roger Best, Brian Hawkins and Simon Whistler
 Cello – Tony Pleeth, Clive Anstee and Nigel Warren-Green
 Double bass – Chris LaurenceProduction Phil Collins – producer
 Hugh Padgham – assistant producer. engineer
 Nick Launay – assistant engineer 
 Karen Siegel – assistant engineer 
 Trevor Key – photography

Chart positions

Album

Singles

Certifications and sales

See also
 List of best-selling albums in Germany

ReferencesBibliography'

Phil Collins albums
1981 debut albums
Atlantic Records albums
Albums produced by Phil Collins
Albums produced by Hugh Padgham
Virgin Records albums
Albums recorded in a home studio